After It All is the second full-length album by American folk rock band Delta Rae, released in 2015.

Track listing

Charts

Critical reception

After it All Has received mixed to positive reviews from critics and fans. Critics often remarked on the album's heavy, orchestral instrumentation; Annie Galving of PopMatters described it as an "almost campy excess," ultimately giving the album seven stars out of a possible ten. Stephen Erlewine, writing for AllMusic, was more critical, writing of the instrumentals, "often, this onslaught feels like overkill because the songs aren't structured to support such heavy arrangements," and giving the album 2.5 stars out of a possible 5.

Personnel
Elizabeth Hopkins - vocals, percussion
Brittany Hölljes - vocals, percussion
Ian Hölljes - guitar (acoustic and electric), ukulele, vocals
Eric Hölljes - keyboards, piano, Wurlitzer, guitar (acoustic and electric), accordion, percussion, vocals
Mike McKee - drums, percussion, acoustic guitar, hammered dulcimer, tympani
Grant Emerson - bass guitar (electric and upright), electric guitar, bowed cymbal

References

External links
iTunes After It All: Credits, Retrieved Apr. 9, 2015.

2015 albums
Delta Rae albums
Sire Records albums
Warner Records albums